Cinnamon is a spice regionally made from several different plants.

Cinnamon may also refer to:

Spices
Cinnamomum, a genus of plants, from some of which cinnamon is produced, including:
Cinnamomum verum, Sri Lanka- or Ceylon cinnamon
Cinnamomum cassia, Chinese cinnamon
Cinnamomum burmannii, Indonesian cinnamon
Cinnamomum loureiroi, Saigon- or Vietnamese cinnamon

Songs
"Cinnamon" (song) by Stone Temple Pilots
"Cinnamon" by The Long Winters, from the 2003 album When I Pretend to Fall
"Cinnamon" by Tiffany, from her 2000 album The Color of Silence
"Cinnamon" by the Wild Strawberries, from the 1994 album Bet You Think I'm Lonely
"Cinnamon", a 1968 song by Johnny Cymbal recorded under the pseudonym Derek
"Cinnamon" by Hayley Williams, from her debut album Petals for Armor

People
Gerry Cinnamon, born Gerard Crosbie (born 1984), Scottish singer-songwriter and acoustic guitarist

Fictional characters
Cinnamon (comics),  a DC Comics Western character
Cinnamon Carter, a character in the Mission: Impossible television series
CinnaMon, a mascot for Apple Jacks cereal
Cinnamon, a female professional wrestler from the Gorgeous Ladies of Wrestling
Cinnamon, the nurse reploid in Mega Man X: Command Mission
Cinnamon J. Scudworth, a character from Clone High
Cinnamon Minaduki, a character in Nekopara

Places
Cinnamon Bay, a body of water and a beach in the U.S. Virgin Islands
Cinnamon Butte, a group of volcanoes and lava domes in Oregon
La Canela, or Valley of Cinnamon, a legendary location in South America

Other uses
 Cinnamon (desktop environment), a user interface developed for Unix-like operating systems
 Cinnamon (film), a 2011 American film
 USS Cinnamon (AN-50), a World War II U.S. Navy ship
 Cinnamon Chaney (born 1969), former association football player for New Zealand
 Cinnamon (Swedish band), Swedish indie pop band
 Cinnamon, a picture book by Neil Gaiman

See also
D'Cinnamons, Indonesian pop band
Sinnamon (disambiguation)